Noncentral distributions are families of probability distributions that are related to other "central" families of distributions by means of a noncentrality parameter. Whereas the central distribution describes how a test statistic is distributed when the difference tested is null, noncentral distributions describe the distribution of a test statistic when the null is false (so the alternative hypothesis is true). This leads to their use in calculating statistical power.

If the noncentrality parameter of a distribution is zero, the distribution is identical to a distribution in the central family. For example, the Student's t-distribution is the central family of distributions for the noncentral t-distribution family.

Noncentrality parameters are used in the following distributions:

 Noncentral t-distribution
 Noncentral chi-squared distribution
 Noncentral chi-distribution
 Noncentral F-distribution
 Noncentral beta distribution

In general, noncentrality parameters occur in distributions that are transformations of a normal distribution.  The "central" versions are derived from normal distributions that have a mean of zero; the noncentral versions generalize to arbitrary means.  For example, the standard (central) chi-squared distribution is the distribution of a sum of squared independent standard normal distributions, i.e., normal distributions with mean 0, variance 1.  The noncentral chi-squared distribution generalizes this to normal distributions with arbitrary mean and variance.

Each of these distributions has a single noncentrality parameter. However, there are extended versions of these distributions which have two noncentrality parameters: the doubly noncentral beta distribution, the doubly noncentral F distribution and the doubly noncentral t distribution.  These types of distributions occur for distributions that are defined as the quotient of two independent distributions.  When both source distributions are central (either with a zero mean or a zero noncentrality parameter, depending on the type of distribution), the result is a central distribution.  When one is noncentral, a (singly) noncentral distribution results, while if both are noncentral, the result is a doubly noncentral distribution.  As an example, a t-distribution is defined (ignoring constant values) as the quotient of a normal distribution and the square root of an independent chi-squared distribution.  Extending this definition to encompass a normal distribution with arbitrary mean produces a noncentral t-distribution, while further extending it to allow a noncentral chi-squared distribution in the denominator while produces a doubly noncentral t-distribution.

There are some "noncentral distributions" that are not usually formulated in terms of a "noncentrality parameter": see noncentral hypergeometric distributions, for example.

The noncentrality parameter of the t-distribution may be negative or positive while the noncentral parameters of the other three distributions must be greater than zero.

See also
Confidence intervals by means of noncentrality parameters

References

External links
 Online calculator for critical values, cumulative probabilities, and critical noncentral parameters